Peritoneal mesothelioma is the name given to the cancer that attacks the lining of the abdomen. This type of cancer affects the lining that protects the contents of the abdomen and which also provides a lubricating fluid to enable the organs to move and work properly.

The peritoneum is made of two parts, the visceral and parietal peritoneum. The visceral peritoneum covers the internal organs and makes up most of the outer layer of the intestinal tract. Covering the abdominal cavity is the parietal peritoneum.

Symptoms and signs

Symptoms of peritoneal mesothelioma include weight loss and abdominal pain and swelling due to a buildup of fluid in the abdomen. Other symptoms of peritoneal mesothelioma may include bowel obstruction, blood clotting abnormalities, anemia, and fever. If the cancer has spread beyond the mesothelium to other parts of the body, symptoms may include pain, trouble swallowing, or swelling of the neck or face.

Causes

Asbestos is a known cause of peritoneal mesothelioma in humans.

A 1975 study of three small villages in central Cappadocia, Turkey—Tuzköy, Karain and Sarıhıdır—found that peritoneal mesothelioma was causing 50% of all deaths. Initially, this was attributed to erionite, a zeolite mineral with similar properties to asbestos, but detailed epidemiological investigation demonstrated that the substance causes the disease mostly in families with a genetic predisposition to mineral fiber carcinogenesis. The studies are being extended to other parts of the region.

Diagnosis

Peritoneal mesothelioma has two clinical types which can be differentiated with the help of CT findings, the "dry" type, and the "wet". It is classified as "dry" when there are multiple tiny masses or one dominant localized mass and generally little or no ascites. The "wet" type has widespread small nodules, no dominant mass, and a presence of ascites.
If fluid is found, the process of eliminating it is through paracentesis; however, the analysis of this fluid has limited diagnostic significance. Normally, a definitive diagnosis may be obtained through tissue biopsy.

Treatment 
Given its rarity, there are no established guidelines for the treatment of peritoneal mesothelioma. The modern approach to malignant peritoneal mesothelioma includes cytoreductive surgery, hyperthermic intraperitoneal chemotherapy (HIPEC), intraperitoneal chemotherapy, and intravenous chemotherapy. These are often used in conjunction and in a complementary fashion, and this multifaceted approach has significantly improved outcomes when compared to intravenous chemotherapy alone. For instance, the reported median survival time for patients with stage IV mesothelioma as reported by the American Cancer Society is 12 months; however, with adequate cytoreduction, intraperitoneal, and intravenous chemotherapy combined, some authors report 10-year survival rates projected at nearly 75%.

Multiple factors have been shown to be significant in predicting the outcome and overall survival. Age greater than 60 at surgery, more overall disease burden (defined as a PCI  greater than 15), complete cytoreduction (no visible disease), and epithelioid subtype pathology have all been shown to be predictors of both mortality and disease progression. These known predictors notwithstanding, many patients with advanced peritoneal mesothelioma are still surgical candidates, and even patients with the highest possible score on the peritoneal carcinomatosis index (39) can be completely reduced to a PCI of 0 with adequate surgery.

See also 
 Asbestosis
 Malignant mesothelioma
 Serous carcinoma

References

This article includes text from the U.S. National Cancer Institute's public domain Dictionary of Cancer Terms.

Further reading 
 
 Malignant mesothelioma entry in the public domain NCI Dictionary of Cancer Terms

External links 

Respiratory system neoplasia
Mesothelioma
Occupational diseases
Digestive system neoplasia